Robert "Bob" S. Nicholson (birth unknown – death unknown) was an English professional rugby league footballer who played in the 1930s, 1940s and 1950s.

Nicholson won caps for England while at Huddersfield in 1945 against Wales, in 1946 against France, in 1947 against Wales, in 1948 against France, in 1949 against Wales, and France, and won caps for Great Britain while at Huddersfield in 1946 against New Zealand, and in 1948 against Australia (2 matches). He also represented Cumberland. Bob Nicholson played left-, i.e.number 11, in Cumberland's 5-4 victory over Australia in the 1948–49 Kangaroo tour of Great Britain and France match at the Recreation Ground, Whitehaven on Wednesday 13 October 1948, in front of a crowd of 8,818. Nicholson played right-, i.e. number 12, in Huddersfield's 4-11 defeat by Bradford Northern in the 1949 Yorkshire County Cup Final during the 1949–50 season at Headingley Rugby Stadium, Leeds on Saturday 29 October 1949. Nicholson played  in Huddersfield's 2-20 defeat by Wigan in the Championship Final during the 1949–50 season at Maine Road, Manchester on Saturday 13 May 1950. His Testimonial match at Huddersfield took place in 1950.

References

External links

Cumberland rugby league team players
England national rugby league team players
English rugby league players
Great Britain national rugby league team players
Huddersfield Giants players
Place of birth missing
Place of death missing
Rugby league players from Cumbria
Rugby league props
Rugby league second-rows
Rugby League XIII players
Year of birth missing
Year of death missing